Safe Cracker is a pinball machine with a safecracking theme, designed by Pat Lawlor, and distributed by Midway (under the Bally label).  It was created in 1996. About 1148 were manufactured.

Description
Safe Cracker differs from a standard pinball game in that the player is playing against the clock as opposed to having a certain number of balls available.  If the player loses a ball, as long as there is time left on the clock they can continue playing.

The machine is smaller in size than a standard pinball machine.  The main objective of the game is to break into the bank's safe.  The game can be broken into 3 areas of play:

 The pinball playfield has numerous targets, the completion of which will allow entry into the bank via the rooftop, the cellar, or the front door.
 Once the player has entered the bank, the game changes to a boardgame that takes place on the backglass.  Using the flipper buttons to make choices, the player spins a dial that is numbered 1 through 5 and moves their piece around the board while being chased by the security guard who rolls a six sided die.  The object of this portion of the game is to advance to the center of the game board (where the safe is located) before being caught by the guard.  If the player is successful, the game will eject a "magic token" from the bank vault for the player to catch as it rolls down the playfield glass.
 After the player is done with the regular game, they can deposit their "magic token" into the token slot of the machine to activate a special game mode called "Assault on the Vault".  In this frenzied 4-ball multiball mode, players have 90 seconds to hit as many drop target and ramp shots as possible to break into the bank vault.

Digital versions
Safe Cracker is available as a licensed table of Pinball FX 3 for several platforms and previously available for The Pinball Arcade.

External links
 
Planetary Pinball webpage for Safe Cracker, hosting a number of in-game audio samples in various formats

1996 pinball machines
Bally pinball machines